Plato Cacheris (May 22, 1929 – September 26, 2019) was an American lawyer.  He was known as one of Washington's premier defense lawyers, particularly prominent in political scandals.

Early life
Cacheris was the son of a Greek immigrant. He grew up in Washington, D.C.  and Pittsburgh, Pennsylvania. His father co-owned a chain of restaurants including the historic downtown restaurant The Waffle Shop in Washington, D.C. In 1951, he joined the U.S. Marine Corps as an officer candidate, but left in 1953 to enter law school. Cacheris graduated from the Edmund A. Walsh School of Foreign Service at Georgetown University and received his Juris Doctor from the Georgetown University Law Center in 1956.

Career
Cacheris was a co-founder of the law firm of Trout and Cacheris in Washington, D.C. He represented various figures in Washington, D.C. scandals, including:

 Defense of Attorney General John N. Mitchell, Watergate scandal figure, with his former partner, the late William G. Hundley.
 Defense of Fawn Hall, Iran-Contra scandal figure, who worked with Oliver North.
 Defense of Congressman Michael "Ozzy" Myers, ABSCAM scandal.
 Co-representation, with Jacob Stein, of Monica Lewinsky, associate of President Bill Clinton.
 Plea bargain for Aldrich Ames, CIA officer turned Russian agent, that enabled his wife to receive a lighter jail sentence for aiding and abetting Ames' espionage.
 Defense of Robert Hanssen, FBI agent and secret agent for the Soviet Union; a plea bargain allowed him to avoid the death penalty in exchange for complete cooperation in revealing his activities to the government, but not to the public. His wife would receive a "survivor" pension.
Defense of Lawrence Franklin of the AIPAC lobbyist Espionage Act controversy
Defense of Ana Montes, analyst of the Defense Intelligence Agency who pleaded guilty to conspiracy to commit espionage for the Intelligence Directorate of Cuba
Defense of Mimi Robinson, ex-wife of Dr. John Rixse

In April 2014, The New York Times reported that during the summer of 2013, NSA leaker Edward Snowden retained Cacheris to negotiate a plea deal with federal prosecutors that would allow Snowden to return to the U.S. and spare him significant prison time. However, The Times noted that nearly a year after Cacheris became involved, negotiations remained at an early stage and no agreement appeared imminent.

References 

1929 births
2019 deaths
20th-century American lawyers
21st-century American lawyers
Criminal defense lawyers
Lawyers from Pittsburgh
Lawyers from Washington, D.C.
Walsh School of Foreign Service alumni
Georgetown University Law Center alumni
American people of Greek descent
Military personnel from Pittsburgh
United States Marines
Deaths from pneumonia in Virginia